Radivoj Bosić (born 1 December 2000) is a Serbian footballer who plays as a winger for Javor.

Club career
On 23 January 2023, Bosić signed a three-year contract with Javor.

Honours
Olimpija Ljubljana
Slovenian Cup: 2020–21

References

2000 births
Living people
Footballers from Belgrade
Serbian footballers
Serbia youth international footballers
Serbia under-21 international footballers
Association football wingers
Red Star Belgrade footballers
RFK Grafičar Beograd players
FK Partizan players
FC Wil players
NK Olimpija Ljubljana (2005) players
C.D. Nacional players
FK Spartak Subotica players
FK Javor Ivanjica players
Swiss Challenge League players
Slovenian PrvaLiga players
Liga Portugal 2 players
Serbian SuperLiga players
Serbian expatriate footballers
Expatriate footballers in Switzerland
Serbian expatriate sportspeople in Switzerland
Expatriate footballers in Slovenia
Serbian expatriate sportspeople in Slovenia
Expatriate footballers in Portugal
Serbian expatriate sportspeople in Portugal